Koprowski (feminine: Koprowska, plural: Koprowscy) is a Polish surname. Notable people with the surname include:

 Franciszek Koprowski (1895–1967), Polish modern pentathlete
 Hilary Koprowski (1916–2013), Polish immunologist
 John L. Koprowski (born 1961), American biologist
 Peter Paul Koprowski (born 1947), Polish-Canadian composer

Polish-language surnames